Battle of Jutland is the football rivalry between two of the oldest clubs in Danish football history, Aalborg BK (founded 1885) and Aarhus GF (founded 1880).

History behind rivalry  
The rivalry between Aalborg BK and Aarhus GF is first and foremost a rivalry between Aarhus and Aalborg, which are respectively the second and the fourth largest cities in Denmark, and two of the most important business centers in Jutland. The rivalry between Aalborg BK and Aarhus GF is also a rivalry between two of the oldest football clubs in Denmark. Both clubs can trace their history all the way back to the 1880s. Aalborg BK and Aarhus GF are also, historically, two of the most successful football clubs in Denmark. Together, they have won nine Danish Superliga titles (Aalborg BK with four and Aarhus GF with five) and 12 Danish Cup titles (Aalborg BK with three and Aarhus GF with nine).

Danish Superliga Games 
The different matches which Aalborg BK and Aarhus GF have played against each other in Danish Superliga:

This gives a total of:

Danish Cup Games 
The different matches which Aalborg BK and Aarhus GF have played against each other in Danish Cup:

Summary

Statistics

Honours

Note: Danish 1st Division titles are from before the inception of Danish Superliga.

Players who have played for both clubs

References

Football rivalries in Denmark
Aarhus Gymnastikforening
 
Nicknamed sporting events